Varposht (also Romanized as Var Posht; also known as Kharā Posht, Khar Posht, and Khar Posht) is a village in Lay Siyah Rural District, in the Central District of Nain County, Isfahan Province, Iran. At the 2006 census, its population was 13, in seven families.

References 

Populated places in Nain County